William Joseph Burns (born 28 April 1989), widely known as Billy Joe Burns, is a footballer from Northern Ireland who plays as a full back for Crusaders.

Career
Burns previously played for Linfield before joining Crusaders in 2014. He was named as Ulster Footballer of the Year and Northern Ireland Football Writers' Association Player of the Year for 2015–16.

Honours
Linfield
NIFL Premiership (3): 2009–10, 2010–11, 2011–12
Irish Cup (3): 2009–10, 2010–11, 2011–12
Crusaders
NIFL Premiership (3): 2014–15, 2015–16, 2017–18
Irish Cup (2): 2018–19, 2021–22
County Antrim Shield (2): 2017–18, 2018–19
Individual awards
Ulster Footballer of the Year (1): 2015–16
Linfield Player of the Year (1): 2012–13

References

Association footballers from Northern Ireland
Linfield F.C. players
Crusaders F.C. players
NIFL Premiership players
Ulster Footballers of the Year
Northern Ireland Football Writers' Association Players of the Year
Living people
1989 births
Association football fullbacks